Abacetus mubalensis is a species of ground beetle in the subfamily Pterostichinae. It was described by Straneo in 1958.

References

mubalensis
Beetles described in 1958